Omentolaelaps mehelyae is a species of mite placed in its own family, Omentolaelapidae, in the order Mesostigmata.

References

Mesostigmata
Endemic fauna of the Democratic Republic of the Congo